The European Youth Go Championship (EYGC) is a championship for young players of the board game of Go. It is held annually, and first started in Băile Felix, Romania in 1996. Some winners of the various age groups, such as Diána Kőszegi, have since progressed to become professional Go players.

The championship was divided into two sections until 2010, when it was split into three age groups.

This event is where one can first see the future European Go leaders, such as Ilya Shikshin or Artem Kachanovskyi, respectively first and second in the adult 2010 European Go Championship (EGC).

History
In its very first year, the U-18 group produced two noteworthy prize-winners: Csaba Mérő (the section winner), and the future professional players Svetlana Shikshina (2nd place) and Alexandre Dinerchtein (3rd place).

Notable prize-winners
Other juniors went on to win senior tournaments.

The U-12 winner in 2000 and 2001, Ilya Shikshin, went on to win the adult European Go Championship, in 2007 and 2010.

Notable U-18 winners who progressed to greater things include Csaba Mérő, Alexandr Dinerchtein (record 7-times-winner of the adult EGC) and Diána Kőszegi.

Awards
From 2010 onwards, these are split into 3 sections. They are for U-12s (players aged under 12), U-16s and U-18s.

Under 12

Under 16
This section was created in 2010, after the World Youth Go Championship altered the age categories under competition.

Under 18

Under 20
During the 2011 championship of Brno, it was mentioned "under 20" category instead of "under 18"

See also
 European Go Championship
 European Pair Go Championship
 European Go Federation
 European Go Players

References

Go competitions in Europe
Go, Youth
Go
1996 establishments in Europe
Recurring sporting events established in 1996